Gerasimus III served as Greek Orthodox Patriarch of Alexandria between 1783 and 1788.

References

18th-century Greek Patriarchs of Alexandria
18th-century Egyptian people